Andre Cipriani (died 18 January 1953) was a Trinidadian cricketer. He played in twenty-three first-class matches for Trinidad and Tobago from 1908 to 1927.

See also
 List of Trinidadian representative cricketers

References

External links
 

Year of birth missing
1953 deaths
Trinidad and Tobago cricketers